Javier Alberto Barreda Jara (13 December 1966 – 3 June 2019) was a Peruvian sociologist, writer and public administrator. Born in Lima, he was educated at Cayetano Heredia University and Pontifical Catholic University of Peru. He served as the Minister of Labor and Promotion of Employment for three months, from January to April 2018.

Early life and education 
Javier Barreda made his high school studies at the Emblematic Educational Institution of Our Lady of Guadalupe in Lima.

He has a degree in sociology from the Pontifical Catholic University of Peru (PUCP) and a master's degree in Project Management and Social Programs from the Cayetano Heredia University.

Political career 
He was advisor in the Congress of the Republic on issues of Budget of the Republic, consumer protection, youth policies, among other topics. Speaker on topics of social development and social programs, employment policies, entrepreneurship, participation and youth.

He was a columnist for several newspapers in the country and published several essays on development and political analysis. All your opinion articles can be seen in the blog Búfalo de Pradera, on the portal La Mula.

He was a professor at the Faculty of Social Sciences of the Universidad Nacional Federico Villarreal. He was professor of the course of National Reality of the Universidad de San Martín de Porres. Likewise, he taught in the Leadership Program for the Transformation of the Andean Development Corporation (CAF) and the Government Institute of the San Martín de Porres University.

From 2006 to 2011, he was Vice Minister of Employment Promotion of the Ministry of Labor.

He was married to Martha Joo and had 2 children.

Minister of Labor and Employment Promotion 
On January 9, 2018, he was sworn in as Minister of Labor and Employment Promotion, convened by President Pedro Pablo Kuczynski in the so-called "Cabinet of Reconciliation". Its management reactivated the National Labor Council, an area of agreement between workers and employers, and put forward the debate on the increase of the minimum wage in Peru. In the context of the resignation of Kuczynski, and as the last decision taken before his departure, Barreda and the president signed Supreme Decree 044 -2018-Trabajo that increases the minimum wage of Peruvian workers from 850 soles to 930 soles, a measure that It was criticized by the business sector and backed by the vast majority of Peruvians. Sustaining his decision as a former minister, Javier Barreda published articles in Peruvian newspapers sustaining the benefit of the increase.

Death 
Barreda Jara died of a heart attack on 3 June 2019 in Lima, at the age of 52.

Works 
1987: Los límites de la voluntad política (Mitin Editores, Lima, 2012).
Contra Historia del Perú, ensayos de historia política peruana (Mitin Editores, 2012). Co-author

References

1966 births
2019 deaths
Peruvian sociologists
21st-century Peruvian politicians
People from Lima
Pontifical Catholic University of Peru alumni
American Popular Revolutionary Alliance politicians